The National Association of Training Corps for Girls (initially the National Association of Girls' Training Corps) was formed in the United Kingdom in 1942 by the then Board of Education. It was the umbrella organisation for the Girls Training Corps (GTC), the Girls' Nautical Training Corps (GNTC), and the Women's Junior Air Corps (WJAC), which had all formed in the years prior.

Girls Training Corps 
The first Girls Training Corps units were formed in 1941. The GTC's purpose, as with other cadet organisations at the time, was to prepare young people for service to their community and to support in the war effort upon reaching adulthood. For the Girls Training Corps this meant training in military drill in preparation for potentially serving in the Auxiliary Territorial Service. The GTC was open to girls aged 14 to 20, and its motto was "To serve and Train for Service".

Activities included learning to act as bicycle couriers, learning morse code, aircraft recognition, gymnastics, homemaking, craft-work, public affairs, land navigation, learning first aid, marksmanship, firefighting, and assisting with air warden duties. During the war and after GTC companies and members were active in volunteering in the community, such as volunteering as "sitter-ins" in hospitals.

The GTC were organised into local units called companies lead by an adult Commandant, these companies would sometimes join other cadet units for joint training. Companies were then grouped into areas lead by an Area Commandant. Within a year of forming, over 120,000 girls had joined a GTC company. Unlike their male counterparts, members of the GTC had to provide their own uniforms using clothing coupons. The uniform consisted of black shoes, navy blue skirt, white blouse, navy blue tie, GTC badge, and a navy blue forage hat.

It was planned that after the War the GTC would be wound down and disbanded, and whilst there was a significant drop in the number of members, there were enough to change the decision to disband the GTC. After the war, following advice from the Youth Advisory Council, there was greater emphasis in the GTC training programme to recognise the girls as "a potential wife and mother". Over 3,000 members of the GTC took part in a parade at the Royal Tournament in 1951. In 1955 Princess Alexandra became patron of the National Association of Training Corps for Girls. In 1964 the GTC and WJAC amalgamated to become the Girls Venture Corps.

Girls' Nautical Training Corps 

The Girls' Nautical Training Corps was formed in 1942, for girls aged 14 to 20, with the majority of units formed in Southern England. It providing training in Royal Navy drill and seamanship, preparing girls for service in the Women's Royal Naval Service, similar to the training and aims of the Sea Cadet Corps.

The Girls' Naval Training Corps numbered 50 Units in 1952, and in the late 1950s changed their name to the Girls' Nautical Training Corps. Lady Pamela Mountbatten was Corps Commandant of the GNTC from around 1952 to around 1959.

The GNTC became a colleague organisation with the Sea Cadet Corps in 1963, often sharing facilities such as Raven's Ait (then also known as TS Neptune). The GNTC became a full member of the Sea Cadet Organisation in March 1980, when the Ministry of Defence approved the admission of girls into the Sea Cadets, this led to a name change to Girls Nautical Training Contingent. This continued until 1992 when the organisation was absorbed, and all girls became members of the Sea Cadet Corps.

Women's Junior Air Corps 

The WJAC did not, initially, receive official support from the Air Ministry, but the Air Ministry did give guidance on ranks, badges, and uniform. The uniform was modelled on that of the RAF and WAAF and consisted of: black shoes, Air Force blue skirt, grey shirt, black tie, WJAC badge, and a grey forage hat. The WJAC was formed in 1939, with larger towns and cities often hosting multiple units. The WJAC provided training and activities in similar areas as the GTC and GNTC, including drill, morse code, marksmanship, physical training, first aid, motor maintenance, and aircraft recognition. Optional training courses included anti-aircraft operational duties, radio location, signals, engineering and electrical work, and clerical and office duties. The core and optional training available were used to prepare girls for service in the Women's Auxiliary Air Force and the Air Transport Auxiliary (ATA). Both WJAC and the GTC were also active in supporting local governments in areas such as health initiatives, an example being providing vitamins to school children. Many Units also formed bands who would perform in parades and services. They were also provided with a limited number of aircraft, such as the Fairchild Argus II, to provide pleasure flights and basic flight instruction.

After the War, WJAC continued with many of the same activities including supporting the community in health initiatives. In 1956 the WJAC expanded its activities to include riding, gliding, and driving lessons. Even into the 1960s the WJAC still had to purchase their own uniforms. In 1964 The GTC and WJAC amalgamated to become the Girls Venture Corps, with the addition of "Air Cadets" added to the title in 1987.

Many famous female pilots were officers in the WJAC, including:
 Diana Barnato Walker, ATA pilot and the first British woman to break the sound barrier
 Freydis Sharland, ATA pilot and founding chairwoman of the British Women Pilots' Association
 Gabrielle Patterson, ATA pilot and WJAC Commandant, 1946-1950
 Jean Bird, first woman to be awarded RAF wings, flying instructor in the WJAC.

Ranks

Girls Venture Corps 
In 1964 the GTC and WJAC amalgamated to become the Girls Venture Corps, which had two wings corresponding to the former GTC (Ground Wing) and WJAC (Air Wing); it was common at this time for former GTC units to share premises with Army Cadet Force units and for former WJAC units to share premises with Air Training Corps units. At this time a new uniform was designed by Norman Hartnell with a variant for each wing. From 1983 girls were accepted into the ACF and ATC, which caused many GVC cadets to transfer to their respective counterparts. It was decided that the GVC would focus on air activities and in 1987 at the request of its membership the organisation was renamed the Girls Venture Corps Air Cadets.

See also 
 Navy League Wrennette Corps - The Canadian equivalent of the Girls' Nautical Training Corps.

References

External links 
Royal Naval Museum Fact Sheet 106 - the Navy League
Women on the home front by Dr. Sarah Haybittle
W.J.A.C. (1950)
1st Kinglassie Women's Junior Air Corps
Knaresborough Recruiting Campaign
WORLD WAR TWO By Pauline Druiff

1942 establishments in the United Kingdom
Military organizations established in 1942
1964 disestablishments in the United Kingdom
Organizations disestablished in 1964
Air Cadet organisations
British Cadet organisations
Youth organisations based in the United Kingdom
Women's organisations based in the United Kingdom